Lee So-yeon (born April 16, 1982) is a South Korean actress. She is best known for her roles in the films Untold Scandal (2003) and Feathers in the Wind (2004), and the television series Spring Waltz (2006), Temptation of an Angel (2009) and Dong Yi (2010).

Career
Lee So-yeon first drew notice in the period film Untold Scandal, playing the Cécile role in the 2003 Korean adaptation of Les Liaisons dangereuses. She has since played villains in several television dramas, namely Super Rookie, Spring Waltz, Temptation of an Angel, and in her most high-profile yet, Korean history's famous femme fatale Jang Hui-bin in Dong Yi. Seemingly a victim of typecasting on TV, Lee was finally given her first leading role in the romantic comedy Why Did You Come to Our House? (also known as Wanted: Son-in-Law). More lighthearted fare followed with My Life's Golden Age (about a family of siblings), and My Love By My Side in which she played a cheerful single mother. In 2012 she returned to period dramas as a gisaeng in Dr. Jin, followed by the contemporary daily dramas The Birth of a Family and Ruby Ring.

Unlike her TV series, Lee's films are a more diverse mix of mainstream and indie. Feathers in the Wind in particular brought her critical raves, with Darcy Paquet of Koreanfilm.org crediting Lee's "considerable screen presence" in making her character "memorable."

Lee counts pansori and jazz dancing among her hobbies. In 2007, she was chosen to be the ambassador for the Jecheon International Music & Film Festival.

From September 2013 to March 2014, Lee appeared on the fourth season of reality/variety show We Got Married, in which celebrities are paired together as fake wedded couples; Lee's partner was pianist Yoon Han. She returned to acting in the cable drama 12 Years Promise in 2014.

In June 2022, Lee launched her personal YouTube channel called 'Lee So-yeon So So TV.

Personal life
Lee married an IT entrepreneur on September 12, 2015. In May 2018, it was reported that the couple were divorcing.

Filmography

Television series

Film

Music video

Television show

Awards and nominations

References

External links

Lee So-yeon at King Entertainment 
 
 
 

1982 births
Living people
South Korean film actresses
South Korean television actresses
Hanyang University alumni
Korea National University of Arts alumni